RAS guanyl-releasing protein 1 is a protein that in humans is encoded by the RASGRP1 gene.

Function 

RAS guanyl nucleotide-releasing protein (RASGRP)  is a member of a family of genes characterized by the presence of a Ras superfamily guanine nucleotide exchange factor (GEF) domain. It functions as a diacylglycerol (DAG)-regulated nucleotide exchange factor specifically activating Ras through the exchange of bound GDP for GTP. It activates the Erk/MAP kinase cascade and regulates T-cells and B-cells development, homeostasis and differentiation.

Gene 

Alternatively spliced transcript variants encoding different isoforms have been identified. The corresponding rat gene rbc7, which lacks a 5-prime exon, represents a 5-prime and 3-prime truncated version of a larger normal rat transcript that encodes a predicted 90-kD protein. This shorter transcript has not been found in humans.

Clinical significance 

In November 2016 a 12-year-old patient was hospitalized for repetitive infections. Scientists have assumed that a genetic problem might be the reason. More specifically, the genetic cause is a defect of the RASGRP1 gene which makes it inactive. .

RASGRP1 plays a role in the functions of natural killer cell dyneins. Since dyneins are motor proteins, their function is to circulate the elements inside the cells. Dr. Orange's laboratory studies have established a functional link between the defects of natural killer cells and dyneins, which in combination with Other observations led doctors to try the drug lenalidommide to treat the patient. The drug was able to reverse certain effects of the mutation RASGRP1.

References

Further reading

External links
 
 

EF-hand-containing proteins